Diapur is a former locality in western Victoria, in Australia situated about 350 km northwest of Melbourne. Diapur is situated on the Melbourne-Adelaide railway line and is the halfway point of the journey.
Diapur has an elevation of approximately 160m above sea level.

Diapur is now located within Nhill. 

Diapur once had a G.J.Coles variety store.

The locality once had a football side, It won a premiership in 1910 and last competed in 1930 in the Lowan Star Football Association.

Towns in Victoria (Australia)
Wimmera